A —also known as , , with a boss called  or —is a reptiloid kami with similarities to yōkai found in traditional Japanese folklore. Kappa can become harmful when they are not respected as gods. They are typically depicted as green, human-like beings with webbed hands and feet and a turtle-like carapace on their back.

The kappa are known to favor cucumbers and love to engage in sumo wrestling. They are often accused of assaulting humans in water and removing a mythical organ called the shirikodama from their victim's anus.

Terminology

The name kappa is a contraction of the words kawa (river) and wappa, a variant form of 童 warawa (also warabe) "child". Another translation of kappa is "water sprites". The kappa are also known regionally by at least eighty other names such as kawappa, kawako, kawatarō, gawappa, kōgo, suitengu.

It is also called kawauso 'otter', dangame 'soft-shelled turtle', and enkō 'monkey', suggesting it outwardly resembles these animals. The name komahiki or "steed-puller" alludes to its reputed penchant to drag away horses.

The kappa has been known as kawako in Izumo (Shimane Prefecture) where Lafcadio Hearn was based, and gatarō was the familiar name of it to folklorist Kunio Yanagita from Hyōgo Prefecture.

Appearance

Kappa are said to be roughly humanoid in form and about the size of a child, inhabiting the ponds and rivers of Japan. Clumsy on land, they are at home in the water, and thrive during the warm months. They are typically greenish in color (or yellow-blue), and either scaly or slimy skinned, with webbed hands and feet, and a turtle-like carapace on their back. Inhuman traits include three anuses that allow them to pass three times as much gas as humans. Despite their small stature they are physically stronger than a grown man.

The kappa are sometimes said to smell like fish, and they can swim like them.

According to some accounts, a kappa's arms are connected to each other through the torso and can slide from one side to the other. While they are primarily water creatures, they do on occasion venture onto land. When they do, the "dish" on their head can be covered with a metal cap for protection.

A hairy kappa is called a hyōsube.

Behavior 

Kappa are usually seen as kami of the water. Their actions range from comparatively minor misdemeanors, such as looking up women's kimono if they venture too near to water, to outright malevolence, such as drowning people and animals, kidnapping children, raping women and at times eating human flesh. Though sometimes menacing, they may also behave amicably towards humans. While younger kappa are frequently found in family groups, adult kappa live solitary lives. However, it is common for kappa to befriend other yōkai and sometimes even people.

Cucumber
Folk beliefs claim the cucumber as their traditional favorite meal. At festivals, offerings of cucumber are frequently made to the kappa. Sometimes the kappa is said to have other favorite foods, such as the Japanese eggplant, soba (buckwheat noodles), nattō (fermented soybeans), or kabocha(Japanese pumpkin).

In Edo (old Tokyo), there used to be a tradition where people would write the names of their family members on cucumbers and send them afloat into the streams to mollify the kappa and prevent the family from coming to harm in the streams. In some regions, it was customary to eat cucumbers before swimming as protection, but in others it was believed that this act would guarantee an attack.

A cucumber-filled sushi roll is known as a kappamaki.

As a menace
As water monsters, kappa have been blamed for drownings, and are often said to try to lure people into water and pull them in with their great skill at wrestling. They are sometimes said to take their victims for the purpose of drinking their blood, eating their livers, or gaining power by taking their , a mythical ball said to contain the soul, which is located inside the anus.

Kappa have been used to warn children of the dangers lurking in rivers and lakes, as kappa have been often said to try to lure people to water and pull them in. Even today, signs warning about kappa appear by bodies of water in some Japanese towns and villages.

Kappa are also said to victimize animals, especially horses and cows. The motif of the kappa trying to drown a horse is found all over Japan.

Lafcadio Hearn wrote of a story in Kawachimura near Matsue where a horse-stealing kappa was captured and made to write a sworn statement vowing never to harm people again.

In many versions the kappa is dragged by the horse to the stable where it is most vulnerable, and it is there it is forced to submit a writ of promise not to misbehave.

Defeating the kappa

It was believed that there were a few means of escape if one was confronted with a kappa. Kappa are obsessed with politeness, so if a person makes a deep bow, it will return the gesture. This results in the kappa spilling the water held in the "dish" (sara) on its head, rendering it unable to leave the bowing position until the plate is refilled with water from the river in which it lives. If a person refills it, the kappa will serve that person for all eternity. A similar weakness of the kappa involves its arms, which can easily be pulled from its body. If an arm is detached, the kappa will perform favors or share knowledge in exchange for its return.

Another method of defeat involves shogi or sumo wrestling: a kappa sometimes challenges a human being to wrestle or engage in other tests of skill. This tendency is easily used to encourage the kappa to spill the water from its sara. One notable example of this method is the folktale of a farmer who promises his daughter's hand in marriage to a kappa in return for the creature irrigating his land. The farmer's daughter challenges the kappa to submerge several gourds in water. When the kappa fails in its task, it retreats, saving the farmer's daughter from the marriage. Kappa have also been driven away by their aversion to iron, sesame, or ginger.

Good deeds
Kappa are not entirely antagonistic to human beings.

Once befriended, kappa may perform any number of tasks for human beings, such as helping farmers irrigate their land. Sometimes, they bring fresh fish, which is regarded as a mark of good fortune for the family receiving it. They are also highly knowledgeable about medicine, and legend states that they taught the art of bone setting to human beings. There are also legends that Kappa will save a friendly human from drowning.

Regional variations 
Along with the oni and the tengu, the kappa is among the best-known yōkai in Japan.

The kappa is known by various names of the creature vary by region and local folklore. In Shintō, they are often considered to be an avatar (keshin) of the Water Deity or suijin.

Shrines are dedicated to the worship of kappa as water deity in such places as Aomori Prefecture or Miyagi Prefecture. There were also festivals meant to placate the kappa in order to obtain a good harvest, some of which still take place today. These festivals generally took place during the two equinoxes of the year, when the kappa are said to travel from the rivers to the mountains and vice versa.

The best known place where it has been claimed Kappa reside is in the  waters of Tōno  in the Iwate Prefecture. The nearby  In Tōno, there is a Buddhist temple that has komainu dog statues with depressions on their heads reminiscent of the water-retaining dish on the kappa's heads, said to be dedicated to the kappa which according to legend helped extinguish a fire at the temple. The Kappa is also venerated at the Sogenji Buddhist temple in the Asakusa district of Tokyo where according to tradition, a mummified arm of a Kappa is enshrined within the chapel hall since 1818.

In his Tōno Monogatari, Kunio Yanagita records a number of beliefs from the Tōno area about women being accosted and even impregnated by kappa. Their offspring were said to be repulsive to behold, and were generally buried.

Cross culture lore
Similar folklore can be found in Asia and Europe. The Japanese folklore creature Kappa is known in Chinese folklore as 神水 shuǐguǐ "water-ghost", or water monkey and may also be related to the kelpie of Scotland and the nixie of Scandinavia. Like the Japanese description of the beast, in Chinese and in Scandinavian lore this beast is infamous for kidnapping and drowning people as well as horses. 

The siyokoy of the Philippine islands is also known for kidnapping children by the water's edge. 

A frog-face vodyanoy is known in Slavic mythology. A green human-like being named a vodník is widely known in western Slavic folklore and tales, especially in the Czech Republic or Slovakia.

In German mythology, a similar creature is known as Wassermann, Nix, or Nickel. They have been mentioned in connection with the larger rivers Elbe and Saale in the eastern part of Germany, but they are most widely connected to Lusatia in South-East Germany. This is not entirely surprising, as the area is not only close to Poland and Czech Republic, but also home to the Slavic minority of the Sorbs.

In popular culture

The kappa is a popular creature of the Japanese folk imagination; its manifestations cut across genre lines, appearing in folk religion, beliefs, legends, folktales and folk metaphors.

In Japan, the character Sagojō (Sha Wujing) is conventionally depicted as a kappa: he being a comrade of the magic monkey Sun Wukong in the Chinese story Journey to the West.

Ryūnosuke Akutagawa's 1927 novella Kappa centers on a man who got lost and ended up in the land of the kappa near Mount Hotakadake. The story heavily focuses on the subject of suicide and Akutagawa killed himself the year the work was published. Kappas are a recurring image in David Peace's novel Patient X, itself about the life and work of Akutagawa.

In anime show Inuyasha, a kappa, Sha Gojyo's descendant said to be a descendant of the legendary character from Journey of the West and together with Son Goku's descendant, the servant of Chokyūkai to find a bride. Later, since Hakudoshi collecting the heads of other yōkai, they tracked down Hakudoshi and Kagura, that he didn't they're Naraku's incarnations, and watching as Hakudoshi to peer into the yōkai heads to catch a glimpse of the Border of the Afterlife.

Kagome's grandfather gave her an alleged mummified foot a kappa for her early 15th birthday, but she doesn't accept and gives to Buyo.

In episode 4 of Yashahime: Princess Half-Demon, Grandpa Higurashi gifted to his great-granddaughter, Moroha a mummified kappa's foot as a gift in which she accepts and kept since then. 

Kappa, and creatures based on them, are recurring characters in Japanese tokusatsu films and television shows. Examples include the kappas in the Daiei/Kadokawa series Yokai Monsters, the 2010 kaiju film Death Kappa, and "King Kappa", a kaiju from the 1972 Tsuburaya Productions series Ultraman Ace.

These yōkai-like kami also represent Japan as a nation, featuring in advertisements for a range of products from a major brand of sake to Tokyo-Mitsubishi Bank's DC Card (a credit card). In their explicitly commercial conceptions, yōkai are no longer frightening or mysterious — the DC Card Kappa, for example, is not a slimy water creature threatening to kill unsuspecting children but a cute and (almost) cuddly cartoon character.

Summer Days with Coo is a 2007 Japanese animated film about a kappa and its impact on an ordinary family, written for the screen and directed by Keiichi Hara based on two novels by Masao Kogure.

It is said that the company president of Calbee liked kappa, so he wanted the name "Kappa" to be included in one of his products. That brought about Kappa Ebisen, a popular shrimp-flavored snack in Japan.

In Teenage Mutant Ninja Turtles III, the titular Turtles accidentally activate the Time Scepter, a mystical artifact, and end up travelling back in time, to the beginning of the Edo period (more specifically 1603). As a running gag, some of the townspeople who interact with them feel frightened by their appearance and mistake them for the legendary "kappa" throughout the movie.

In Mountain of Faith, The character Nitori Kawashiro Is a kappa, Her boss fight reflects the aquatic nature of kappas.

See also

 Kappabashi-dori, a Tokyo street named after the kappa
 Kijimuna, a spirit creature from Okinawa
 Kappa, a novel by Ryūnosuke Akutagawa
 Mintuci, a water spirit from Ainu mythology
 Neck, a shapeshifting water spirit in Germanic mythology and folklore

References

Bibliography

External links
Mark Schumacher (2004). Kappa – River Imp or Sprite. Retrieved 23 March 2006.
Garth Haslam (2000). Kappa Quest 2000. Retrieved 14 December 2006.
Kirainet (2007). For a look at Kappa in popular culture Kirainet. Retrieved 6 May 2007.
Hyakumonogatari.com Translated kappa stories from Hyakumonogatari.com
Kappa Unknown Explorers
Underwater Love (2011)
The Great Yokai War (2005)
Summer Days with Coo (2009) Animation film featuring a Kappa as main character.

 
Legendary turtles
Water spirits
Yōkai
Mythological hematophages
Piscine and amphibian humanoids